Marie-Paule Van Eyck (born 22 June 1951) is a Belgian fencer. She competed in the women's individual foil event at the 1976 Summer Olympics. Her daughter, Émilie Heymans, was also an Olympic athlete representing Canada in diving.

References

External links
 

1951 births
Living people
Belgian female foil fencers
Olympic fencers of Belgium
Fencers at the 1976 Summer Olympics
People from Frameries
Belgian emigrants to Canada
Sportspeople from Hainaut (province)